A Journal of the Plague Year was an album released on CD in 1999 by American singer-songwriter Tom Rapp, leader of the 1960s/70s psychedelic folk group Pearls Before Swine.  It was his first new album for 26 years, and included collaborations with Damon and Naomi and Nick Saloman.

Track listing
All songs written by Tom Rapp unless otherwise noted.

Musicians
Tom Rapp - Vocals, Guitar, Harmonica
Olvardil Prydwyn - Harp, Mandolin, Shenai, Flute
Naomi Yang - Bass, Vocals
Damon Krukowski - Drums, Percussion, Vocals
Nick Saloman - Guitar, Organ, Drums, Mellotron
Ade Shaw - Bass, Effects
David Rapp - Electric Guitar
Carl Edwards - Violin, Vocals
Andrea Troolin - Cello

Other credits
Produced and engineered by Damon Krukowski at Kali Studios, Cambridge, Mass.
Except "Shoebox Symphony" produced by Nick Saloman and Ade Shaw

External links
[  AMG review]
 Fan site on MySpace

1999 albums
Tom Rapp albums
Albums produced by Damon Krukowski
Albums produced by Ade Shaw